The WCW World Tag Team Championship was a professional wrestling World Tag Team Championship contested for in World Championship Wrestling (WCW). Originally, WCW was a member of the National Wrestling Alliance (NWA), which had numerous member promotions. The NWA operated many tag team championships before one prime tag team title was established in 1982. One of those titles was the NWA World Tag Team Championship, which was operated by the NWA member Mid-Atlantic Championship Wrestling (MACW), the predecessor of WCW. The championship was created by MACW in 1975.

In January 1991, WCW (the former MACW) began the process of withdrawing as a member of the NWA to become an independent promotion, thus the name of the title was changed to the WCW World Tag Team Championship. On July 12, 1992, the WCW World Tag Team Championship was unified with the NWA World Tag Team Championship, which was created earlier that year by the NWA as its prime tag team championship. In September 1993, WCW's withdrawal from the NWA was made official, and the NWA World Tag Team Championship was returned to the NWA; the title was reactivated by the NWA in 1995.

In March 2001, all WCW assets were purchased by the then World Wrestling Federation (WWF) after AOL/Time Warner discontinued their involvement in wrestling programming. After the purchase, the WWF continued the use of the championship as a part of a storyline called The Invasion, which involved a rivalry between former WCW wrestlers and original WWF wrestlers before the purchase of WCW.

Title reigns were determined either by professional wrestling matches with different tag teams, a duo of wrestlers, involved in pre-existing scripted feuds, plots and storylines or were awarded the title due to scripted circumstances. Wrestlers were portrayed as either villains or fan favorites as they followed a series of tension-building events, which culminated in a wrestling match or series of matches for the championship. The inaugural champions, under the NWA, were The Minnesota Wrecking Crew (Gene Anderson and Ole Anderson), who were announced to have won the titles after winning a tournament in January 1975.

Before the promotion's purchase, the final champions recognized by WCW were Sean O' Haire and Chuck Palumbo; they were also the first champions under the titles operation in the WWF. On November 18, 2001, the championship was deactivated after its use in the Invasion storyline. The title was unified with the WWF Tag Team Championship, and the final champions recognized by the WWF, were The Dudley Boyz (Bubba Ray Dudley and D-Von Dudley). The title was won in Australia, Canada, Germany, and the United States. Harlem Heat (Booker T and Stevie Ray) held the most reigns as a tag team (10), and Booker T held the most individual reigns (11), which is the same number of times the title was vacated. At 282 days, Doom's reign during WCW's NWA withdrawal was the longest in the championship's history. Overall, there were 143 title reigns.

Reigns

Names

Combined reigns

By team

By wrestler

See also
 List of former championships in WWE
 Tag team championships in WWE

Footnotes
  - This title reign is included twice for the purpose of showing the different recognitions by WCW and the WWF.

References
General
 
 
 
 
Specific

WWE tag team champion lists
World Championship Wrestling champions lists